The Bank of Thailand (BOT) (Abrv: ธปท.;) is the central bank of Thailand.

History 
The Bank of Thailand (BOT) was first set up as the Thai National Banking Bureau. The Bank of Thailand Act was promulgated on 28 April 1942 vesting upon the Bank of Thailand the responsibility for all central banking functions. The Bank of Thailand started operations on 10 December 1942.

The Bank of Thailand Act, B.E. 2485 was later amended in order to put emphasis on its social responsibility, to create a mechanism to guard against economic crisis, as well as to set up its decision making process to ensure good governance and transparency in the organization. The Bank of Thailand Act, B.E. 2551 came into force on 4 March 2008.

Roles and responsibilities 
The Bank of Thailand's mission is to provide a stable financial environment for sustainable economic growth in order to achieve continuous improvement in the standard of living of the people of Thailand.

Governors
The Governor of the Bank of Thailand has a five-year term of not more than two consecutive terms. The Minister of Finance nominates a candidate to the Thai Cabinet. When the cabinet passes a resolution approving the candidate, it is presented to the monarch for his approval.

List of governors

See also

 Thai baht
 Economy of Thailand
 Bank of Thailand Museum

References

External links

 Official website

Thailand
Independent administrative organizations of Thailand
Economy of Thailand
Banks of Thailand
1942 establishments in Thailand
Banks established in 1942